Behesht Lat (also Romanized as Behesht Lāt and Behashtlāt) is a village in Otaqvar Rural District, Otaqvar District, Langarud County, Gilan Province, Iran. At the 2006 census, its population was 43, in 13 families.

References 

Populated places in Langarud County